"Rok the Nation" is a single released by Swedish electronic music duo Rob'n'Raz featuring rapper Leila K in 1990. It reached number 41 in the UK.

Critical reception
Mick Mercer from Melody Maker commented, "Ah, now here's something interesting. Leila K [...] has a nice voice that made "Got to Get" the little fun bundle that it was. This is more interesting, with som studiously sharp vocals and a chintzy keyboard carpet pattern for her to rub the dirt into. It's tougher than you'd expect with lovely trumpet touches and a successful plunge down to the rhythm near the end followed by some fast, oddly stippled vocal delivery." David Giles from Music Week wrote, "The team that sneaked a surprise hit with the recent "Got to Get" follow up with a track that is heavy enough to please clubbers but with enough hooks to succeed chartwise again. The drum machine break sounds suspiciously similar in Japan's "Vision Of China" though..." Sian Pattenden from Smash Hits felt that "this is harder, dare I say funkier than 'Got to Get'".

Versions
 Rok The Dancefloor 6:52
 Radio Edit 3:43
 SweMix Club Version 5:20
 Panik Mix 6:08
 Funk-E-Drummer Mix 6:11
 Like A Drum Mix 3:42

Charts

References

External links

1990 singles
Rob'n'Raz songs
Leila K songs
1990 songs
Songs written by Leila K
English-language Swedish songs